The Lippische Mitteilungen aus Geschichte und Landeskunde (in short: Lippische Mitteilungen) is an annual academic journal covering all aspects of the history of the former Land Lippe, respectively the present Kreis Lippe and its historical development and integration in the region Ostwestfalen-Lippe and the Weser Uplands. From 1903 till 2008 it was published by the association.

References

External links

Mitteilungen aus der lippischen Geschichte und Landeskunde, digitized at the Lippe State Library at Detmold
Lippische Mitteilungen aus Geschichte und Landeskunde, digitized at the Lippe State Library

Academic journals published in Germany
European history journals
Publications established in 1903
Annual journals
German-language journals